Len Hutton captained the English cricket team in Australia in 1954–55, playing as England against Australia in the 1954–55 Ashes series and as the MCC in other matches on the tour. It was the first time that an England team had toured Australia under a professional captain since the 1880s. After losing the First Test by an innings, they beat Australia 3–1 and retained the Ashes. The combination of Frank Tyson, Brian Statham, Trevor Bailey, Johnny Wardle and Bob Appleyard made it one of the strongest bowling sides to tour Australia, and it was the only team of any nationality to defeat Australia at home between 1932–33 and 1970–71.

The England touring team

Management

The tour was managed by Geoffrey Howard, the popular secretary of Lancashire County Cricket Club who had been a wicketkeeper-batsman for the Private Banks XI in 1926–36 and had played three games for Middlesex. He was in the RAF during the Second World War and once hit a century before lunch playing for their cricket team. Howard had managed the MCC tour of India and Sri Lanka in 1951–52, and on a later tour would smooth things over when some players tipped water over umpire Idris Begh in Pakistan in 1955–56. "The 'Ger" ran a happy ship and even played in a couple of non-first class matches. He had been given no funds by the MCC (he was meant to return a profit) and had to take out an overdraft from an Australian bank until he could pay his way with gate receipts. When Len Hutton was stricken with fibrositis at the start of the Third Test, it was Howard and Duckworth who convinced him to play. George Duckworth had been England's wicketkeeper in the 1920s, but now managed the team's baggage and travel arrangements. He "was guide, philosopher and friend to all who had the sense to see the worth of his experience of cricket in Australia" and liaised with the press corps. One innovation was the appointment of Harold Dalton as the team physiotherapist. Previously the players had used local masseurs.

Captain
The selection of the MCC touring team was not without controversy. Len Hutton was the first professional England captain since Arthur Shrewsbury in 1876–77 other than as a temporary stop-gap. This break with tradition received much criticism from those who thought only a gentleman should hold this honour, but England had been heavily defeated by Australia in every series since the war, and even the West Indies in 1950. Hutton had been brought up in the hard school of Yorkshire cricket under George Hirst and Herbert Sutcliffe. Even so, he "...was a tactical genius, whose assistance was often sought..." by amateur captains, but in his day professionals were not trained as captains and the burden sat heavily on his shoulders.

He began well with a 3–0 victory over India in 1952 and regained the Ashes 1–0 in 1953. England pulled back from being 2–0 down to square a series in the West Indies in 1953–54 despite political interference, riots and dubious umpiring. England drew 1–1 with Pakistan in 1954, but Hutton was ill for two Tests and the Rev David Sheppard captained England. There was talk that the Sussex amateur should lead the MCC in Australia and New Zealand. Fortunately, wiser counsels prevailed and Hutton was confirmed as captain. Of the amateurs on tour Bill Edrich was an old comrade and had been a professional before the war, and the others – Reg Simpson, Trevor Bailey, Peter May and Colin Cowdrey – had been schoolboys when Hutton was making Test centuries. As a result, Hutton's right to the captaincy was not questioned, the team were happy to play under him and his conscientious vice-captain Peter May was particularly helpful. As a working class Yorkshireman he was not fully adept in social graces, and he gave his after-dinner speeches in "Pudsey English". When dealing with the press corps, Hutton used heavy silences and "developed the art when it suited him of delivering with much gravity Delphic utterances which his hearers could interpret however they pleased"

Hutton captained England in 23 Tests – of which he won 11, drew 8 and lost 4 – and proved to be one of the most successful captains in England's history. They never lost a series in which he was captain and England regained the Ashes from Lindsay Hassett's powerful 1953 Australians—the first such success in 19 years. He was fortunate in the quality of the young England players available in the 1950s, but he used them to the utmost effect. More than any other player he knew the strain of facing high-quality fast bowling and used his own fast bowlers ruthlessly. Hutton would often slow the over rates both to rest them in the Australian heat and to break the concentration of the batsmen, as he knew that strokemakers could be got out through frustration alone. These tactics did not endear him to the crowds, or the "old guard" back home who preferred the carefree attacking captaincy of the amateur, but they were very effective. The Yorkshireman also made bowling changes with great cunning, notably in the Fourth Test at Adelaide, and his ability to read a wicket during a match sometimes verged on second sight. Frank Tyson wrote that Hutton was "pursued by his own personal demons. He will never be completely content until the series has been won and he has exorcised his two personal tormentors, Lindwall and Miller. Not for a moment does he relax his own bottled up intensity". There have been more inspirational captains and those with more flair and imagination, but few matched Len Hutton for sheer bloody-minded determination to win. He retired from the game soon after the tour and was knighted for services to cricket in 1956.

Batsmen
England had a strong batting line up: Len Hutton (averaging 56.67), Bill Edrich (40.00), Peter May (46.77), Colin Cowdrey (44.06), Denis Compton (50.06) and Trevor Bailey (29.74), with Tom Graveney (44.38) standing in for the injured Compton and out-of-form Edrich in the two Sydney Tests. Hutton was the holder of the then record Test score of 364 and had by far the best batting average of either team in 1950–51 (88.83) and 1953 (55.37). The main problem was finding a suitable opening partner once Cyril Washbrook (42.81) had retired. Reg Simpson (33.35) was the only other opener in the team and thought the job should be his. He had been on the sidelines for years, and had made 156 not out at Melbourne in the 1950–51 Ashes series when Australia was beaten for the first time in 12 years. Though chosen for the First Test he failed and did not find his form until late in the series. As a result, Hutton tried Bailey, Edrich and Graveney in the number two position. England's opening-partnership problem remained unsolved until the emergence of John Edrich and Geoffrey Boycott in the 1960s. With the strong Australian bowling on their home turf, runs were hard to come by and only the obstinate stonewaller "Barnacle" Bailey exceeded his career Test average in a low-scoring series (37.00 over 29.74). Keith Miller wrote "I reckon he has saved more matches for England than anyone else since the war. His figures belie his worth to England. When a fielding side sees him coming in, a trough of deep depression immediately settles around the area". Bill Edrich had been a Squadron Leader during the war and won the DFC for his part in the "RAF's most audacious and dangerous low-level bombing raid" on Cologne in 1941. Edrich had "an immense relief that he survived" becoming a bon viveur who lived for the day and a gutsy batsman who was "almost indifferent to his own safety. No bowler is too fast to hook; no score too large to defy challenge." Vic Wilson was a strapping Yorkshire farmer who could hit the ball many a mile, but failed to come to terms with the Australian pitches. The baby-faced Colin Cowdrey, an Oxford undergraduate and the youngest member of the side, was a real find with his immaculate timing of the ball in the first of a record six tours of Australia. "The 22-year-old had received news of his father's death at the start of the tour, but soldiered on, thanks to the advice and encouragement of his young teammate Peter May and father figure and captain Len Hutton". Even so, Hutton made a small bet that Wilson would score more Test runs than Cowdrey on the tour Tyson worked on his batting and in 1954 "was building up a reputation as an all-rounder, scoring consistently with the bat", and even batted at number seven on the tour. The team scored fewer Test runs than any England team in Australia for fifty years, but with such talent somebody usually got the vital runs and, except at Brisbane, England had the advantage.

Bowlers
Like Australia, England had a rich seam of bowling talent in the 1950s, so much so that they left behind fast bowler Fred Trueman (average 21.57), off-spinner Jim Laker (21.24) and slow left armer Tony Lock (25.58) who between them had taken 15 wickets in the Ashes-winning Fifth Test at the Kennington Oval in 1953. The most likely explanation is that these outspoken cricketers were regarded as 'difficult tourists' by the MCC and Hutton thought that "Fiery Fred" had yet to mature as a bowler. As in every series since the war it looked like the England bowling would rest on the broad shoulders of Alec Bedser (24.89)—in 1954 his 231 wickets was the greatest haul in Test history. His lethal combination of in-swingers and leg-cutters had taken 30 wickets (at 16.06) on the 1950–51 tour and 39 wickets (at 17.48) in 1953. The unfortunate Bedser suffered from shingles, had seven catches dropped off him in the First Test, where he was hit for 1/131, was dropped and never got back into the side. He took to bowling to the Australian team in the nets and Keith Miller told him "You're not too bad for a Test discard. If you want a game you can come over and play with us". In the last four Tests Hutton relied on the formidable bowling attack of Frank Tyson (18.76), Brian Statham (24.84), Trevor Bailey (29.21), Johnny Wardle (20.39) and Bob Appleyard (17.87). While "Typhoon" Tyson is justly famed for simply blasting the opposition away, the nagging accuracy of Statham and Bailey and the increasing spin of Wardle and Appleyard all served to tie down and frustrate the Australian batsmen. In fact the spinners took wickets with a faster strike rate (1 wicket every 57 balls) and at a lower average (21.57) than the fast bowlers. Like Simpson the fast swing bowler Peter Loader (22.51) thought that he should have played in the Tests and was unlucky not to do so. Big Jim McConnon also had a bad tour, he was never really seen as an adequate alternative for Jim Laker, didn't find his form and was sent home early after a couple of painful injuries. Bill Edrich had opened the England bowling before the war, but rarely bowled in the 1950s. Len Hutton, Tom Graveney and Colin Cowdrey were part-time leg-spinners who were only really used in up-country games.

Fielding
Evans is a grand keeper. On this tour he proved that he is the outstanding keeper in the world today. I have never seen a better keeper than Tallon as he was in England in 1948...but that time has passed. Evans is now the world best. That's the way things go and the way we Australians are supposed to like it. Evans reminds me always of a fox terrier. He simply cannot stand still whilst on the cricket field. He moves with short, quick steps, dives, literally dives, at the ball when it is returned badly out of his reach...
Bill O'Reilly
England's lamentable fielding at Brisbane – they dropped 14 catches – set a new low in Tests, made even worse by Australia's obvious superiority in this department. As a result, the tourists worked on this aspect of their game and improved through the tour, they could hardly do worse. In the First Test the exuberant Godfrey Evans – the outstanding wicket-keeper of the era – was suffering from heat-stroke, so debutant Keith Andrew was behind the stumps; he dropped Arthur Morris on 0 (he made 153) and didn't take any catches. Evans recovered and took over the rest of the series, taking a magnificent leg side catch off Tyson to dismiss Neil Harvey at Melbourne that precipitated Australia's collapse. Len Hutton (57 catches), Peter May (42), Bill Edrich (39) and Tom Graveney (80) were fine slip catchers, and Colin Cowdrey (120) proved to be an excellent one, but Hutton had fibrositis, Edrich and Bedser proved ungainly in the field and Denis Compton not only had his knee problem, but broke his hand on a billboard at Brisbane. As a result, the young bowlers had to exhaust themselves in the outfield instead of resting between spells. Vic Wilson never got to grips with the Australian pitches, but was a noted fielder and was used as a substitute.

First Test – Brisbane

See Main Article – 1954–55 Ashes series

Second Test – Sydney

See Main Article – 1954–55 Ashes series

Third Test – Melbourne

See Main Article – 1954–55 Ashes series

Fourth Test – Adelaide

See Main Article – 1954–55 Ashes series

Fifth Test – Sydney

See Main Article – 1954–55 Ashes series

Ceylon
The English team had a stopover in Colombo en route to Australia and played a one-day single-innings match there against the Ceylon national team, which at that time did not have Test status.

Further reading
 John Arlott, Australian Test Journal. A Diary of the Test Matches Australia v. England 1954–55, The Sportsman's Book Club, 1956
 John Arlott, John Arlott's 100 Greatest Batsmen, MacDonald Queen Anne Press, 1986
 Peter Arnold, The Illustrated Encyclopedia of World Cricket, W. H. Smith, 1985
 Sidney Barnes, The Ashes Ablaze: The M. C. C. Australian tour, 1954–55, Kimber, 1955
 Ashley Brown, The Pictorial History of Cricket, Bison, 1988
 Bill Frindall, The Wisden Book of Test Cricket 1877–1978, Wisden, 1979
 Arthur Gilligan, The Urn Returns: A Diary of the 1954–55 M. C. C. Tour of Australia, Deutsch, 1955
 Tom Graveney and Norman Miller, The Ten Greatest Test Teams  Sidgewick and Jackson, 1988
 Chris Harte, A History of Australian Cricket, Andre Deutsch, 1993
 Alan Hill, Daring Young Men: MCC Tour to Australia – 1954–55, Methuen Publishing Ltd, 2004
 Keith Miller, Cricket Crossfire, Oldbourne Press, 1956
 Ian Peebles, The Ashes 1954–55, Hodder and Stoughton, 1955
 Playfair Cricket Annual 1955
 Alan Ross, Australia 55: A Journal of the MCC Tour, Joseph, 1955
 E. W. Swanton and C. B. Fry, Test Matches of 1954/55 Victory in Australia, The Daily Telegraph, 1955
 E. W. Swanton (ed), Barclay's World of Cricket, Willow, 1986
 Roy Webber, The Australians in England, A Record of the 21 Australian Cricket Tours of England 1878–1953, Hodder & Stoughton, 1953
 Crawford White, England Keep the Ashes: The Record of the England and M. C. C. Tour of Australia, 1954–55, News Chronicle, 1955
 Bob Willis and Patrick Murphy, Starting With Grace: A Pictorial Celebration of Cricket, 1864–1986, Stanley Paul, 1986
 Wisden Cricketers' Almanack 1956, "MCC in Australia and New Zealand, 1954–55"

References
 E. W. Swanton, Swanton in Australia with MCC 1946–1975, Fontana/Collins, 1975
 Frank Tyson, In the Eye of the Typhoon: The Inside Story of the MCC Tour of Australia and New Zealand 1954/55, Parrs Wood Press, 2004

1954 in English cricket
1954 in Australian cricket
1955 in English cricket
1955 in Australian cricket
1954 in Ceylon
1954-55
1954
Australian cricket seasons from 1945–46 to 1969–70
International cricket competitions from 1945–46 to 1960
Sri Lankan cricket seasons from 1880–81 to 1971–72
1954-55